Rosside is a small village in Cumbria, England, on the outskirts of Ulverston. Rosside is part of the Ulverston parish, as are the neighbouring villages of Pennington, Swarthmoor and Loppergarth.

Geography 
Rosside is loosely split into two areas, 'Little' (La'al) Rosside and 'Great' Rosside. These two groups of buildings are split by the stream running through the village, which is fed by the Barton reservoir at the Spade Forge.

Places of interest
A local landmark is Rosside Dam. Built to power the water wheel of the Lancashire Spade Company forge.

Rosside has a few historical buildings to be noted:
 Rosside House, built in 1729 and its adjoining coach house
 The old iron forge with its rustic watermill and waterfalls
 The Telephone Box, which is an original 1953 edition Location of the Cow Ear music video Telephone Box.

References

 OS:2500 gazetteer
 Ulverston Post Office records: Villages surrounding Ulverston
 Flooding in Rosside

Villages in Cumbria
Ulverston